The 1966 Prague Skate was a senior international figure skating competition held in Czechoslovakia in November 1966. Medals were awarded in the disciplines of men's singles, ladies' singles, pair skating, and ice dancing; future Olympic medalists won gold in the first three categories. In the men's event, Czechoslovakia's Ondrej Nepela defeated West German national champion Peter Krick and the Soviet Union's Sergei Chetverukhin on his way to his second Prague Skate title. Hana Mašková took the ladies' title for the second year in a row, outscoring Hungary's Zsuzsa Almassy and Austria's Elisabeth Nestler. The pairs' podium was filled by Germans, led by West Germany's Margot Glockshuber / Wolfgang Danne.

Men

Ladies

Pairs

Ice dancing

References

Prague Skate
Prague Skate